Julia Figueroa (born 7 April 1991) is a Spanish judoka. She competed at the 2016 Summer Olympics in the women's 48 kg event, in which she was eliminated in the second round by Dayaris Mestre Álvarez.

In 2021, she competed in the women's 48 kg event at the 2021 Judo World Masters held in Doha, Qatar. A month later, she won one of the bronze medals in her event at the 2021 Judo Grand Slam Tel Aviv held in Tel Aviv, Israel. In June 2021, she won one of the bronze medals in the women's 48 kg event at the 2021 World Judo Championships held in Budapest, Hungary.

She won one of the bronze medals in her event at the 2022 Judo Grand Slam Tel Aviv held in Tel Aviv, Israel.

References

External links
 
 
 
 

1991 births
Living people
Spanish female judoka
Olympic judoka of Spain
Judoka at the 2016 Summer Olympics
Judoka at the 2020 Summer Olympics
Mediterranean Games gold medalists for Spain
Mediterranean Games medalists in judo
Competitors at the 2018 Mediterranean Games
Judoka at the 2015 European Games
Judoka at the 2019 European Games
European Games medalists in judo
European Games bronze medalists for Spain
Sportspeople from Córdoba, Spain
21st-century Spanish women